Virgilia may refer to:
 Virgilia, the wife of Coriolanus in Shakespeare's play Coriolanus
 Virgilia, California, an unincorporated community
 Virgilia, the wife of the Roman general Gaius Marcius Coriolanus
 Virgilia (plant), a genus of South African trees in the family Fabaceae
 Virgilia (bug), a genus of true bugs in the family Lophopidae
 Virgilia (ship, 1918), a ship of the Cunard line that smashed into the Thames barge Kathleen of Greenwich in 1923
 A common name for Cladrastis kentukea, a tree of eastern North America
 Virgilia, character of 07th Expansion Sound Novel Umineko no Naku Koro ni
 Virgilia Hazard, a fictitious abolitionist character in the popular TV mini-series North and South